Newbridge railway station  is a heritage-listed former railway station on the Main Western railway line, Newbridge, Blayney Shire, New South Wales, Australia. The property was added to the New South Wales State Heritage Register on 2 April 1999.

History

Description 

The heritage-listed complex includes a type 3 station building, built in the second class sub-type 1 design in 1882. The platform faces date from 1882 and 1914 respectively. The station also contains a timber footbridge dating from 1914 and a timber, skillion roofed signal box dating from 1915. The station lamp room and a Gregory 5 ton jib crane are also included in the heritage listing.

Heritage listing 
The group is significant as it forms an intact small mainline station complex in good condition with an unusual adaptation of the building and platform to achieve duplication. It represents in unaltered form a station complex  with track and yard arrangements still in position. The buildings and site form an integral part of the town of Newbridge, without which the town would not have survived.

The station building is a very fine early railway structure located within an intact setting. The other structures add to the completeness of the site and are good representative examples of their types when built.

Newbridge railway station was listed on the New South Wales State Heritage Register on 2 April 1999 having satisfied the following criteria.

The place possesses uncommon, rare or endangered aspects of the cultural or natural history of New South Wales.

This item is assessed as historically rare. This item is assessed as scientifically rare. This item is assessed as arch. rare. This item is assessed as socially rare.

See also

References

Attribution 

New South Wales State Heritage Register
Blayney Shire
Disused regional railway stations in New South Wales
Articles incorporating text from the New South Wales State Heritage Register
Railway stations in Australia opened in 1882
Main Western railway line, New South Wales